Michael Nagy (born 29 November 1980) is a New Zealand international lawn and indoor bowler.

Bowls career
Nagy has won two Asia Pacific Bowls Championships gold medals and won a bronze medal at the 2016 World Outdoor Bowls Championship in Christchurch in the triples with Ali Forsyth and Blake Signal before winning a gold medal in the fours with Forsyth, Signal and Mike Kernaghan.

He was selected as part of the New Zealand team for the 2018 Commonwealth Games on the Gold Coast in Queensland.

He won the 2013/14 pairs title and 2013/14 fours title at the New Zealand National Bowls Championships when bowling for the Taren Point Bowls Club.

References 

1980 births
New Zealand male bowls players
Living people
New Zealand sportsmen
Bowls World Champions
Bowls players at the 2018 Commonwealth Games
Commonwealth Games competitors for New Zealand
20th-century New Zealand people
21st-century New Zealand people